Frédéric Darras (19 August 1966 – 27 October 2010) was a French football defender who played over 200 matches in Ligue 1 and had a spell playing in the English First Division.

Career
Born in Guînes, Darras began playing youth football with ES Guînes. At age 15, he was recruited by Guy Roux to the youth side of AJ Auxerre. He joined the club's professional team in 1987, and would make over 100 senior appearances for the club before leaving in 1992. Darras joined Ligue 1 rivals FC Sochaux-Montbéliard and SC Bastia. He was part of the Bastia squad that reached the 1995 Coupe de la Ligue Final.

Darras signed with Swindon Town in August 1996. He made 55 senior appearances during his two seasons with the club.

Darras returned to France in 1998 and finished his playing career with Ligue 2 side FC Red Star Saint-Ouen.

Personal
Darras died after suffering a heart attack on 27 October 2010.

References

External links
 
 
 
 Profile at Afterfoot.fr

1966 births
2010 deaths
French footballers
Association football defenders
Ligue 1 players
Ligue 2 players
AJ Auxerre players
FC Sochaux-Montbéliard players
SC Bastia players
Swindon Town F.C. players
Red Star F.C. players
French expatriate footballers
French expatriate sportspeople in England
Expatriate footballers in England